Company B 1st Battalion 181st Infantry Regiment is a rifle company in the 1st Battalion 181st Infantry Regiment. In the National Guard, companies sometimes have two histories. They share the history of the regiment to which they are assigned, but also may have a unique company history and lineage. Therefore, Company B 1-181 IN shares the long history of the 181st Infantry Regiment. This site concentrates on the unique history of Company B as a militia / National Guard company in Gardner and Greenfield (Detachment 1), Massachusetts. Company B served in the Continental Army during the American Revolution, with Union forces in the American Civil War, and as a federalized Massachusetts National Guard regiment with the U.S. Army during the Spanish–American War, Mexican Border Campaign, World War I and World War II. Most recently the Company B has served in Guantanamo Bay Cuba, in New Orleans following Hurricane Katrina, and in Afghanistan. (See below for the separate history of Detachment I in Greenfield.

History of Company B (Gardner)

Massachusetts Army and the American Revolution
The company was first formed during the late Revolutionary War as the 5th Company, 8th Regiment of Mass. Militia.

Civil War
The company served in the Civil War with the 15th Mass. Infantry. On July 12, the regiment was mustered into the United States service with under Major Charles Devens, Jr. It was mustered out on 21 July 1864 in Worcester, Massachusetts.

National Guard and overseas service
Mobilized for service in the War with Spain on 13 May 1898. The company served within the United States and was mustered out of service on 21 January 1899.

The land forces of the Massachusetts Volunteer Militia were redesignated as the Massachusetts National Guard on 15 November 1907.

In June 1916 the company was sent to the Mexican Border as part of the 5th Mass. Infantry. The 5th Mass. served on the Mexican Border at El Paso, Texas.

World War I
In March 1917 the company was designated as Company H, 104th Infantry Regiment of the 26th Yankee Division for service in the First World War. In France the company served in all of campaigns of the Yankee Division and was awarded the French Croix de Guerre with Gilt Star for the heroic fight at Apremont on 10–13 April 1918. This was the first time in U.S. history that an American unit was decorated for bravery by a foreign power.

On 1 April 1923, was designated as Company H of the 181st Infantry Regiment.

World War II
The company was mobilized in January 1941 for one year of training with the Yankee Division. The year of training ended in December 1941 but the company's service continued after the Japanese attack on Pearl Harbor brought the United States into the Second World War.
Company H was relieved from duty with the 26th (Yankee) Infantry Division and served with the 181st Infantry Regiment on coastal defense duty until February 1944, when the 181st Infantry was broken up with the soldiers going to be infantry replacements in the Italian Campaign.

In 1946, the company was re-established and became Company B 1-181 Infantry. The WWII battle honors and service in the Army of Occupation in Austria of the 328th Infantry were credited to the 181st Infantry. The company served through the Cold War.

Later service
On 15 October 2001 Company B, 1-181 Infantry was mobilized for one year duty at Fort Monmouth, New Jersey, providing base security in support of Operation Noble Eagle following the 9-11 attacks on the United States.

On 8 September 2003, Company B, 1-181 Infantry was mobilized for one year duty at Guantanamo Bay, Cuba providing security for the detention facilities at Camp America and Camp Delta in support of Operation Enduring Freedom.

In September 2005, Company B mobilized as an element of JTF Yankee for rescue and security operations in New Orleans following Hurricane Katrina.

In 2006, Co B 1-104 IN was amalgamated as Detachment 1, of Company B, 1-181 IN.

In August 2010, Company B 1-181 IN deployed for one year of service with the International Security Force in Afghanistan in support of Operation Enduring Freedom. The company conducted security in Laghman, Nangahar, Nuristan and Khandahar Provinces in Afghanistan.

Battles
American Civil War, Company, 5th Massachusetts Infantry
Balls Bluff
Peninsula
Antietam
Fredericksburg
Wilderness
Spotsylvania
Cold Harbor
Petersburg.

Spanish–American War, 5th Massachusetts Infantry

Mexican Border campaign, 5th Massachusetts Infantry

World War I, H Company, 104th Infantry Regiment (United States)
Champagne Marne
Aisne Marne
Saint Mihiel
Meuse Argonne
Isle De France 1918
Lorraine 1918

World War II, H Company, 328th Infantry Regiment (United States)
Northern France
Rhineland
Ardennes-Alsace
Central Europe

Global War on Terror, Company A 1-104 IN / Company A 1-181 Infantry
Guantanamo Bay
Afghanistan War (2001-Present)

Unit decorations

History of Detachment 1, Company B (Greenfield)

Colonial campaigns
The present Detachment 1 of Company B of the 181st Infantry was first mustered in 1753 in Greenfield. The company served the French and Indian War (1754–63) in the Abercrombie expedition against Fort Ticonderoga (1758) and the Amherst expedition. (1759–60)

Massachusetts Army and the American Revolution
In the Revolutionary War, the company saw active service at Ticonderoga and at Hubbardston during the Saratoga Campaign.

In 1787 the company was reorganized as an artillery battery. During Shays' Rebellion (1786-7) the battery fought against the rebels to defend the Federal Arsenal in Springfield. A cannoneer from Greenfield was the sole federal casualty of that conflict.

Civil War
In 1859 reorganized as Company G of the 10th Light Infantry Regiment. Mobilized on 21 June 1861 as Company G of the 10th Massachusetts Infantry Regiment. Served throughout the Civil War with the Army of the Potomac.

National Guard and overseas service
Mobilized for service in the War with Spain on 9 May 1898. The company served with the 2nd Massachusetts Infantry in the Santiago (Cuba) Campaign fighting at El Caney and was mustered out of service on 3 November 1898.

The land forces of the Massachusetts Volunteer Militia were redesignated as the Massachusetts National Guard on 15 November 1907.

In June 1916 the company was sent to the Mexican border as part of the 2nd Massachusetts Regiment. The 2nd Mass. was based at Columbus, New Mexico, and was the only National Guard Regiment to cross the border into Mexico with General Pershing's Punitive Expedition.

World War I
In March 1917 the company was designated as Company L, 104th Infantry Regiment of the 26th Yankee Division for service in the First World War. In France the company served in all of campaigns of the Yankee Division and was awarded the French Croix de Guerre with Gilt Star for the heroic fight at Apremont on 10–13 April 1918. This was the first time in U.S. history that an American unit was decorated for bravery by a foreign power.

World War II
The Company L was mobilized in January 1941 for one year of training with the Yankee Division. The year of training ended in December 1941 but the company's service continued after the Japanese attack on Pearl Harbor brought the United States into the Second World War. Company L, 104th Infantry deployed to Europe with the 104th Infantry Regiment and fought from Normandy across Germany to meet the Soviets in Czechoslovakia at war's end. The 104th awarded the Croix de Guerre and Fourragere by France for actions in breaching the Siegfried Line. The company served in the Army of Occupation in Czechoslovakia and Austria until 1946.

In 1946, the company was re-established and became Company B 2nd Battalion 104th Infantry. The company served through the Cold War.

Later service
In September 2005, Company B mobilized as an element of JTF Yankee for rescue and security operations in New Orleans following Hurricane Katrina.

In 2006, Co B 1-104 IN was amalgamated as Detachment 1, of Company B, 1-181 IN.

In August 2010, Company B 1-181 IN deployed for one year of service with the International Security Force in Afghanistan in support of Operation Enduring Freedom. The company conducted security in Laghman, Nangahar, Nuristan and Khandahar Provinces.

Battles
King Philip's War, Hampshire Regiment
Battle of Bloody Brook
Battle of Turner's Falls

French and Indian wars, Hampshire Regiment
Siege of Louisbourg (1745)
Battle of Lake George
Ticonderoga

American Revolutionary War, Hampshire Regiment
Ticonderoga
Saratoga

American Civil War, Company G, 10th Massachusetts Infantry
Peninsula
Antietam
Fredericksburg
Chancellorsville
Gettysburg
Wilderness
Spotsylvania
Cold Harbor
Petersburg
Virginia 1863

Spanish–American War, Company L, 2nd Massachusetts Infantry
Santiago, Cuba

Mexican Border campaign, L Company, 2nd Massachusetts Infantry

World War I, L Company, 104th Infantry Regiment (United States)
Champagne Marne
Aisne Marne
Saint Mihiel
Meuse Argonne
Isle De France 1918
Lorraine 1918

World War II, L Company, 104th Infantry Regiment (United States)
Northern France
Rhineland
Ardennes-Alsace
Central Europe

Global War on Terror, Company B 1-181 Infantry
Afghanistan War (2001–2021)

Unit decorations

See also
 181st Infantry Regiment (United States)
 104th Infantry Regiment (United States)
 Headquarters Company 1-181 Infantry (Wellington Rifles)
 Company A 1-181 Infantry (Springfield Rifles)
 Company C 1-181 Infantry (Cambridge City Guard)
 Company D 1-181 Infantry (Hudson Light Guards)
 1181 Forward Support Company

Notes

Military units and formations in Massachusetts
Companies of the United States Army National Guard